Osage Township is a township in Vernon County, in the U.S. state of Missouri.

Osage Township was erected in 1855, taking its name from the Osage people.

References

Townships in Missouri
Townships in Vernon County, Missouri